USS Exultant is a name used more than once by the U.S. Navy:

 , was a coastal minesweeper launched on 27 September 1941.
 , was a minesweeper launched 6 June 1953.

References

United States Navy ship names